Ron Vaudry is a Canadian comedian who has also worked extensively in the United Kingdom. He also appeared in The Late Show with Arsenio Hall.

References

Canadian stand-up comedians
Living people
Year of birth missing (living people)
Canadian male comedians
Place of birth missing (living people)